The 2021–22 Radford Highlanders men's basketball team represented Radford University in the 2021–22 NCAA Division I men's basketball season. The Highlanders, led by first-year head coach Darris Nichols, played their home games at the Dedmon Center in Radford, Virginia, as members of the Big South Conference.

Previous season
The Highlanders finished the 2020–21 season 15–12, 12–6 in Big South play to finish in second place. They lost to Campbell in the semifinals of the Big South tournament.

Roster

Schedule and results

|-
!colspan=12 style=| Exhibition

|-
!colspan=12 style=| Non-conference regular season

|-
!colspan=12 style=| Big South Conference regular season
|-

|-
!colspan=12 style=| Big South tournament
|-

|-

Source

References

Radford Highlanders men's basketball seasons
Radford Highlanders
Radford Highlanders men's basketball
Radford Highlanders men's basketball